In monetary economics, the equation of exchange is the relation:

where, for a given period,
 is the total  money supply in circulation on average in an economy.
 is the velocity of money, that is the average frequency with which a unit of money is spent.
 is the price level. 
 is an index of real expenditures (on newly produced goods and services).

Thus PQ is the level of nominal expenditures.  This equation is a rearrangement of the definition of velocity:  V = PQ / M.  As such, without the introduction of any assumptions, it is a tautology.  The quantity theory of money adds assumptions about the money supply, the price level, and the effect of interest rates on velocity to create a theory about the causes of inflation and the effects of monetary policy.

In earlier analysis before the wide availability of the national income and product accounts, the equation of exchange was more frequently expressed in transactions form:

where
 is the transactions velocity of money, that is the average frequency across all transactions with which a unit of money is spent (including not just expenditures on newly produced goods and services, but also purchases of used goods, financial transactions involving money, etc.).
 is an index of the real value of aggregate transactions.

Foundation 

The foundation of the equation of exchange is the more complex relation:

where:
The equation:
   
is based upon the presumption of the classical dichotomy — that there is a relatively clean distinction between overall increases or decreases in prices and underlying, “real” economic variables — and that this distinction may be captured in terms of price indices, so that inflationary or deflationary components of p may be extracted as the multiplier P, which is the aggregate price level:   

where  is a row vector of relative prices; and likewise for

Generally,  could be infinite.
There are two variants of this formula: 

 = 

and 

Also,  can be determined by the methods of the fuzzy sets.
 
If liquidity function , then, by the mean value theorem: 

 = 

Naganoff's formula is used to describe in details the processes of inflation and deflation, Internet trading and cryptocurrencies.

Applications

Quantity theory of money 

The quantity theory of money is most often expressed and explained in mainstream economics by reference to the equation of exchange.  For example, a rudimentary theory could begin with the rearrangement

 
and thus

where
 is time.

Money demand 

Economists  Alfred Marshall, A.C. Pigou, and John Maynard Keynes, associated with Cambridge University, focusing on money demand instead of money supply, argued that a certain portion of the money supply will not be used for transactions, but instead it will be held for the convenience and security of having cash on hand. (The Cambridge economists also thought wealth would play a role, but wealth is often omitted for simplicity.) The Cambridge equation for demand for cash balances is thus:

which, given the classical dichotomy and that real income must equal expenditures , is equivalent to

Assuming that the economy is at equilibrium, that real income is exogenous, and that k is fixed in the short run, the Cambridge equation is equivalent to the equation of exchange with velocity equal to the inverse of k:

The money demand function is often conceptualized in terms of a liquidity function,

History 

The equation of exchange was stated by John Stuart Mill who expanded on the ideas of David Hume. The algebraic formulation comes from Irving Fisher, 1911.

See also 
 Irving Fisher § Economic theories

Notes

References
 Michael D. Bordo (1987). "equation of exchange," The New Palgrave: A Dictionary of Economics, v. 2, pp. 175–77.
 Milton Friedman (1987.  “quantity theory of money”, in The New Palgrave: A Dictionary of Economics ), v. 4, pp. 3–20.

Monetary economics